The Boston Louie Memorial is a NEMA Light and Midget race held annually at Seekonk Speedway's Open Wheel Wednesday. The event headlines as two races, both 29 laps long in memorial of Louie's chosen car number as an owner. "Boston" Louie Seymour died on September 13, 1996.

2002-2004 location change
The 2002-2004 Boston Louie Memorial races were all held at the Waterford Speedbowl, not Seekonk Speedway. This happened after the 2001 racing season for NEMA, when the series was determining its schedule. Seekonk Speedway had just finished its racing season, and was in the process of shutting down the track for the Winter months. Seekonk officials generally decide their schedules the year of the racing season, not at the close of the season. When NEMA contacted Seekonk officials to get an early commitment for a 2002 race date, the Seekonk officials did not want to confirm a date yet, due to the racing season still months away for them. Despite open communications, NEMA eventually moved the race to Waterford. NEMA and Seekonk officials still wanted to give a race date due to the history NEMA has with Seekonk, but Seekonk officials felt that they needed addition sponsorship for the race, along with the sponsorship NEMA would be bringing for the race. The Boston Louie Memorial would later return to Seekonk Speedway in 2005, and has stayed at Seekonk from then on.

Race winners

References

American open wheel series races
Midget car racing
Annual sporting events in the United States
Seekonk, Massachusetts